The canton of Frasne is an administrative division of the Doubs department, eastern France. It was created at the French canton reorganisation which came into effect in March 2015. Its seat is in Frasne.

It consists of the following communes:
 
Arc-sous-Montenot
Bannans
Bonnevaux
Boujailles
Bouverans
Brey-et-Maison-du-Bois
Bulle
Chapelle-des-Bois
Chapelle-d'Huin
Châtelblanc
Chaux-Neuve
Courvières
Le Crouzet
Dompierre-les-Tilleuls
Fourcatier-et-Maison-Neuve
Les Fourgs
Frasne
Gellin
Les Grangettes
Les Hôpitaux-Neufs
Les Hôpitaux-Vieux
Jougne
Labergement-Sainte-Marie
Levier
Longevilles-Mont-d'Or
Malbuisson
Malpas
Métabief
Montperreux
Mouthe
Oye-et-Pallet
Petite-Chaux
La Planée
Les Pontets
Reculfoz
Remoray-Boujeons
La Rivière-Drugeon
Rochejean
Rondefontaine
Saint-Antoine
Saint-Point-Lac
Sarrageois
Touillon-et-Loutelet
Vaux-et-Chantegrue
Les Villedieu
Villeneuve-d'Amont
Villers-sous-Chalamont

References

Cantons of Doubs